Vegard Aanestad (born 12 June 1987) is a Norwegian professional football defender. He has played for Viking and Sandnes Ulf.

He moved to Viking in January 2009, while also Bryne and Strømsgodset were interested in signing the player. At Viking, Aanestad only featured in 2 cup matches. After moving to Sandnes Ulf in 2010, he was a regular starter in the First Division and also after the club's promotion to Eliteserien. Following his departure from Sandnes Ulf, Aanestad has played for Randaberg in the Third and Fourth Division.

Career statistics

References

External links
 Vegard Aanestad player info at the official Viking website 

1987 births
Living people
Sportspeople from Stavanger
Norwegian footballers
Association football defenders
Randaberg IL players
Viking FK players
Sandnes Ulf players
Norwegian Fourth Division players
Norwegian Third Division players
Norwegian First Division players
Eliteserien players